Peter Coupar (17 October 1866 – 6 July 1944) was a Scottish footballer who played for in the Football League for Bolton Wanderers and Stoke.

Career
Coupar started his career playing for his local club Dundee Wanderers. In 1888 he moved south of the border to Bolton Wanderers where he played three times in 1888–89 scoring once on 15 September 1888 in a 4–3 defeat against Burnley. He left midway through the campaign for Kidderminster Harriers before returning to the Football League with Stoke. He played eleven times during 1889–90 scoring three goals as the Potters failed to gain re-election and had to join the Football Alliance. Coupar scored two goals in three matches in both league and cup in 1890–91 helping Stoke win the Football Alliance title and regain their league status. He left at the end of the campaign for Northern League side Middlesbrough Ironopolis.

Career statistics

Honours
with Stoke
Football Alliance champions: 1890–91

References

Scottish footballers
Dundee Wanderers F.C. players
Stoke City F.C. players
English Football League players
1866 births
1944 deaths
Football Alliance players
Association football forwards
Bolton Wanderers F.C. players
Kidderminster Harriers F.C. players
Middlesbrough Ironopolis F.C. players